"I'm Gonna Make You Mine" is a song released on February 2, 1994 by American R&B singer Tanya Blount. It is the lead single from her debut album, Natural Thing. The song peaked to No. 57 on the Billboard R&B Singles chart. The song bears no relation to the same-named 1969 Lou Christie hit.

Track listing
I'm Gonna Make You Mine Promo CD Single
1.) I'm Gonna Make You Mine (DJ Eddie F Mix) [4:00]
2.) I'm Gonna Make You Mine (Christian's Mix) [4:11]
3.) I'm Gonna Make You Mine (Steve "Silk" Hurley Mix) [4:26]

Critical reception
Billboard called it a "hip-swaying pop/funk jam (that) ushers a promising new vocalist into the urban radio fold. Chunky beats click respectably, while Blount vamps with ample range and confidence. She is clearly inspired by a solid song that is strengthened by a catchy sing-along chorus. A mixed bag of sturdy remixes aims for street juice, club approval and mature audience acceptance—and should succeed greatly. An enticing peek into Blount's "Natural Thing" debut."

Charts

References

1994 singles
Tanya Blount songs
1994 songs
Songs written by Chantay Savage
Polydor Records singles